Daniel "Dani" Abalo Paulos (born 29 September 1987) is a Spanish former professional footballer who played as a right winger.

He began his career at Celta, playing almost exclusively in the Segunda División, and won the Bulgarian league title twice with Ludogorets.

Club career

Celta
Born in Vilagarcía de Arousa, Province of Pontevedra, Abalo joined local RC Celta de Vigo for his last year as a junior, then proceeded to make his senior debuts with the B team in the Segunda División B. On 3 December 2006 he made his first competitive appearance with the main squad, coming in as a late substitute in a 2–2 La Liga away draw against RCD Mallorca; in late July 2009 he extended his contract with the Galicians until 2013, with a buyout clause of €10 million.

From 2008 to 2011, with Celta in the Segunda División, Abalo was an important first-team element. However, in the 2011–12 season, as the club returned to the top flight after an absence of five years, he contributed only four games and 67 minutes, being subsequently loaned in quick succession to Gimnàstic de Tarragona and S.C. Beira-Mar (the latter in Portugal).

Ludogorets
On 26 June 2013, Bulgarian champions PFC Ludogorets Razgrad announced they were set to sign Abalo after he became a free agent shortly after. The transfer was completed the following day after he passed his medical, and the player agreed to a two-year contract, being given the number 17 shirt.

Abalo played his first game with his new team on 17 July 2013, featuring in a 2–1 away defeat against ŠK Slovan Bratislava in the second qualifying round of the UEFA Champions League. He made his league debut three days later in the 1–0 loss at FC Lyubimets 2007; in the second leg against Slovan on the 24th, he scored twice for a 3–0 win at Ludogorets Arena and the subsequent qualification.

Abalo made his debut in the Champions League group phase on 16 September 2014, grabbing a 1–1 equaliser away against Liverpool in the 90th minute, but in an eventual 2–1 defeat. He repeated the feat in the second match between the two sides, a 2–2 draw.

Having won the league title in both of his seasons, Abalo left Ludogorets in May 2015 with the intention of returning to Spain or moving to England.

Later career
On 24 July 2015, Abalo signed a two-year contract at Turkish Süper Lig club Sivasspor. He made his debut on 23 August, scoring from Cicinho's assist in a 4–2 loss at Eskişehirspor.

Abalo returned to his country on 20 January 2016, joining Deportivo Alavés until the end of the second-tier campaign. After gaining promotion with the Basques he travelled abroad again, to Poland's Korona Kielce on 3 September. A week later he made his debut in Ekstraklasa, replacing compatriot Miguel Palanca for the final seven minutes of a 1–0 home win over Arka Gdynia; his first goal came on 17 October, again off the bench to equalise in a 1–2 loss to Śląsk Wrocław at the Kielce City Stadium.

On 31 August 2017, Abalo signed a three-year deal at FC Cartagena in Spain's division three. His team won their group in his first season, but were eliminated from the playoffs by Extremadura UD, and in his second year he was loaned to UP Langreo of the same league; his contract was rescinded on 3 July 2019.

Career statistics

Club

Honours
Ludogorets
Bulgarian A Professional Football Group: 2013–14, 2014–15
Bulgarian Cup: 2013–14
Bulgarian Supercup: 2014

Alavés
Segunda División: 2015–16

References

External links

Dani Abalo at Celta de Vigo 

1987 births
Living people
Spanish footballers
Footballers from Vilagarcía de Arousa
Association football wingers
La Liga players
Segunda División players
Segunda División B players
Celta de Vigo B players
RC Celta de Vigo players
Gimnàstic de Tarragona footballers
Deportivo Alavés players
FC Cartagena footballers
UP Langreo footballers
Racing de Ferrol footballers
Primeira Liga players
S.C. Beira-Mar players
First Professional Football League (Bulgaria) players
PFC Ludogorets Razgrad players
Süper Lig players
Sivasspor footballers
Ekstraklasa players
Korona Kielce players
Spanish expatriate footballers
Expatriate footballers in Portugal
Expatriate footballers in Bulgaria
Expatriate footballers in Turkey
Expatriate footballers in Poland
Spanish expatriate sportspeople in Portugal
Spanish expatriate sportspeople in Bulgaria
Spanish expatriate sportspeople in Turkey
Spanish expatriate sportspeople in Poland